Magali Amadei (born November 30, 1974) is a French yoga teacher, model, actress, and writer.

Biography
Amadei was discovered at age 16 while studying ballet at The Opera House in Nice. After a summer spent modeling in New York City, she abandoned her original plan to move to Japan for pre-medical education, and instead pursued modeling full-time. Amadei was featured on the covers of Cosmopolitan and Glamour, but also suffered from the eating disorder bulimia for seven years while working as a fashion model, and sought help after passing out at a photo shoot. After treatment she began visiting schools to share her experience with students. She also appeared in television and film roles, including supporting and minor roles in House of D and Taxi. In 2009, with co-author Claire Mysko, Amadei published the book Does This Pregnancy Make Me Look Fat?, about body changes and social expectations during pregnancy. The Los Angeles Daily News praised the book for taking on issues around pregnancy "in a hip, compassionate way".

Filmography
 Inferno! (1992), Ellen Von Unwerth
 Blood Trail (1997), Naomi
 The Groomsmen (2001), Tanya
 The Wedding Planner (2001), Wendy
 The Mind of the Married Man (2001, TV)
 Kingpin (2003, TV)
 House of D (2004), Coralie Warshaw
 Taxi (2004), Fourth Robber

References

External links
 
 

1974 births
Living people
People from Nice
French female models
French film actresses
French television actresses
French expatriates in the United States